Zoltán Káldy (born 7 January 1969 in Győr, Győr-Moson-Sopron) is a retired Hungarian long-distance runner who specialized in the 10,000 metres.

Achievements

External links
 
 

1969 births
Living people
Hungarian male long-distance runners
Athletes (track and field) at the 1992 Summer Olympics
Athletes (track and field) at the 1996 Summer Olympics
Olympic athletes of Hungary
Sportspeople from Győr